The Texas Chainsaw House is located in Kingsland, Texas, on the grounds of The Antlers Hotel. This 1900s Victorian house was featured prominently in Tobe Hooper's horror film The Texas Chain Saw Massacre as the home of Leatherface and his cannibalistic family, before it was moved to this location from Williamson County in 1998. The then-dilapidated farm house originally sat on Quick Hill Road during the July–August 1973 filming of the movie. The original site is where La Frontera is now located, in Round Rock.
 Location of The Texas Chain Saw Massacre farmhouse at Quick Hill – 

In 1998, the house was cut into six pieces in order to be moved, then reassembled and restored to its original condition by master carpenter Anthony Mayfield on behalf of an investor couple in Austin, Texas. The house was a "pattern book" house, ordered from a catalog and assembled on site from a package of materials brought by wagon from a local lumber company. Research indicates it was likely built between 1908 and 1910.

Two identical twins
A densely overgrown identical twin of the house was later found at La Frontera as well, and it too was cut into pieces and moved, but to nearby Georgetown and restored. It is known locally as the Burkland-Frisk house as it was built by an early settler in Williamson County, Leonard Frisk, and was later owned by Tony Burkland, a relative of the Frisk family. The house originally sat across the street from the Texas Chainsaw House on Quick Hill Road, but it was later moved to another location within La Frontera and was not originally recognized as a twin because of the dilapidated condition of the house and it being completely overthrown with plants and trees.  It was moved in 2006 and restored by the developers of La Frontera, Don Martin and Bill Smalling (1953–2008). It sits on San Gabriel Village Blvd prominently overlooking the South San Gabriel River and is used as an office.

Film sets
Replicas of the original house were built as sets for 2013-2017 film series, appearing in Texas Chainsaw 3D and its 2017 prequel Leatherface respectively.

A duplicate of the house was also featured in a post-credits scene in Texas Chainsaw Massacre, a 2022 sequel picking up several decades after the original film.

See also
Antlers Hotel (Kingsland, Texas)
La Frontera (Round Rock, Texas)
Kingsland, Texas
Georgetown, Texas

References

Railway hotels in the United States
Relocated buildings and structures in Texas
Relocated houses
The Texas Chainsaw Massacre (franchise)
Queen Anne architecture in Texas